Vitessa suradeva is a moth of the family Pyralidae. It is found in India, Bangladesh, Myanmar, Thailand, Vietnam and Sri Lanka.

Description
Its head and thorax are golden yellow. The antennae are black. Abdomen with black and white bands. Base of forewing golden yellow. There are two subbasal metallic black spots on forewing. Hindwings white. The species' larval food plant is Dichapetalum gelonioides.

Subspecies
Two subspecies are recognized.

Vitessa suradeva suradeva Moore, [1860] - North India, Thailand, Vietnam, Bangladesh, Myanmar
Vitessa suradeva rama Moore, 1885 - South India, Sri Lanka

References

External links
Discovery of the Ten Species of Subtropical-moths in Is. Daecheong, Korea
Taxonomic review of the superfamily Pyraloidea in Bhutan

Pyralinae
Moths of Asia
Moths described in 1860